Iocetamic acid (trade name Cholebrin) is a pharmaceutical drug taken by mouth and used as an iodinated contrast medium for X-ray imaging of the gall bladder.

It is not known to be marketed anywhere in the world in 2021.

References 

Radiocontrast agents
Iodoarenes
Acetanilides